The Gospel According to John is a part of the Pillar New Testament Commentary series. It provides a comprehensive introduction to the Gospel of John. It was published in 1990 and written by D. A. Carson, who is also the General Editor of the series.

In 1992, Christianity Today magazine awarded it Number 1 Critic's Choice for Commentaries and Runner-up Reader's Choice.

References

External links

1990 non-fiction books
Biblical commentaries
Commentary, Pillar